The Collège de Champigny is a private secondary school. Founded by the Sacred Heart Brothers in 1969, it was established to provide education to everyone, according to the wishes of Father André Coindre, its founder.

It is the only
private school in L'Ancienne-Lorette and in the Sainte-Foy sector of Québec City.

From 1945 to 1967, the mission of the Sacred Heart Brothers in the college was to form future priests and brothers. Part of the building still houses the brothers and former professors.

External links
 Site du Collège de Champigny
 Site de la Fondation du Collège

Education in Quebec City